The 2016 FIBA European Championship for Small Countries was the 15th edition of this tournament. It was hosted by Moldova.

Armenia won its first ever gold in this championship by beating Andorra in the final, 79–71.

Teams
After the withdrawal of Monaco, which was initially drawn in the Group B, eight countries joined the tournament:

The national team of Armenia made their official debut in a FIBA competition.

Draw
The draw took place on 22 January 2016.

Preliminary round
All times are local (UTC+3).

Group A

Group B

Classification round
All times are local (UTC+3).

Classification 5–8 places

Seventh place game

Fifth place game

Final round
All times are local (UTC+3).

Semifinals

Third place game

Final

Final ranking

References

External links 
 The Championship at FIBA.com
 FIBA Europe website of the European Championship for Small Countries

FIBA European Championship for Small Countries
Small Countries
International sports competitions hosted by Moldova
Basketball in Moldova
2016 in Moldovan sport
FIBA European Championship for Small Countries
FIBA European Championship for Small Countries